The 1962 Daytona Continental 3 Hour Grand Touring and Sports Car Race was an endurance race at the 6.132 km (3.8102 mile) road circuit at the Daytona International Speedway, Daytona Beach, Florida, USA, that took place on February 11, 1962. It was the first race of the 1962 World Sportscar Championship.

Race 
The race took place on a cold and dry day, in front of 14,000 spectators. Phil Hill and Ricardo Rodíguez finished second, 48 seconds behind in their Ferrari 246 SP, while Jim Hall finished third in his Chaparral 1.

Official Results

Did Not Finish

Did Not Start

References 

24 Hours of Daytona
1962 World Sportscar Championship season
Sports car races